Jean Bonhomme (8 June 1924 – 16 October 2020) was a French politician.

Bonhomme served as a member of the French National Assembly from 1968 to 1981 and again from 1986 to 1988.

He was the father of François Bonhomme, Mayor of Caussade since 2008 and Senator from Tarn-et-Garonne since 2014.

References

1924 births
2020 deaths
20th-century French politicians
Members of the National Assembly (France)
Union for the New Republic politicians
Union of Democrats for the Republic politicians
Rally for the Republic politicians
People from Tarn-et-Garonne